Momtaj Iqbal is a Jatiya Party (Ershad) politician and the former Member of Parliament of Sunamganj-4. She was married to Major (retired) Iqbal Hossain Chowdhury, former Jatiya Party minister.

Career
Iqbal was elected to parliament from Sunamganj-4 as a Jatiya Party candidate in 2008.

Death
Iqbal died on 17 April 2009.

References

Jatiya Party (Ershad) politicians
2009 deaths
Women members of the Jatiya Sangsad
8th Jatiya Sangsad members
21st-century Bangladeshi women politicians